Snakes in the Playground is the fifth album by the band Bride. Seen by critics as the best release of Bride's hard rock era, Snakes in the Playground is commonly known as the breakthrough album in the band's career. This album would produce for the band more touring, press appeal, and two GMA Dove Awards for best song.

In 2010, HM Magazine listed Snakes in the Playground at No. 45 on its Top 100 Christian Rock Albums of All Time list stating that it "best captured the apex of their live energy and great songwriting" and is "a turning point for the legitimacy of true hard rock in the Christian market (as opposed to overly premeditated/watered-down youth group filler). Snakes… was to Bride what Appetite… was to G ‘n R." Heaven's Metal fanzine ranked it No. 9 on its Top 100 Christian metal albums of all-time list.

Recording
The work on Snakes in the Playground began after the band arrived at their home of Kentucky from the tour that followed Kinetic Faith, with the line up of Dale Thompson, Troy Thompson, Rick Foley and Jerry McBroom.  Bride spent a great deal of time in pre-production fine tuning its material and eventually came up with two demo tapes of nine songs each. On this album the band tried to capture their live performance energy on the album, and ended up creating a rawer and more straightforward hard rock album compared to Kinetic Faith. The band has said that they did not want to work with the producer Steve Griffith, and ended up working with the New Jersey native, Plinky, who had previously produced for a band called Novella. The album was recorded at The Saltmine Studios in Nashville, and included several guest musicians: Peter Furler and John James from the Newsboys, Rick Florian from White Heart for back up vocals, Greg Martin from the Kentucky Headhunters, Rick Elias, and Derek Jan from Novella for some solo guitar spots. The band has said that they decided to name the album Snakes in the Playground after they had an incident with a large snake at the studio:

Overview
The album's output is a combination of energetic hard rock numbers such as "Rattlesnake" and "Would You Die For Me," and more hook-laden, faster songs such as "Psychedelic Super Jesus" and "Don’t Use Me" as well as tracks that have elements of the band's metal roots such as "Fall Out" and "Dust Through a Fan." The ballad "I Miss The Rain" has a similar feel as "Sweet Louise," which is the closing song on Kinetic Faith.

Dale Thompson's vocals continues to showcase his raspy and blues based output. Tracks such as "Fallout" and "Would You Die For Me" display his wider vocal range, while the ballad “I Miss The Rain” reflects a calmer vocal style. Troy Thompson's rhythm guitar work is more based on groove, and combines work with the guest musicians Dez Dickerson (Prince), Derek Jan (Novella), and Greg Martin (Kentucky Headhunters) for an abundance of gritty lead guitar work. Other guest appearances are made as background vocalists by Rick Florian (White Heart) and Newsboys, and Rick Elias plays harmonica.

According to Dale Thompson, the lyrics on Snakes in the Playground were inspired by personal experiences and the letters the band received from its fans during the months before recording. The album's lyrics are based upon social problems from Christian point of view. The lyrics deal with subject such as drug abuse, suicide, abortion, gang violence, and other issues.

"Rattlesnake" begins with an intro of a preacher stating, "Jesus is knocking on the door of your heart today" followed by wailing sirens as pounding drums fade away. "Rattlesnake" speaks against those who give drugs to kids in order to turn them into addicts. "Psychedelic Super Jesus" is about a band in Bride’s hometown of Louisville that  In Dale’s words, "They see Jesus as a hippie guru living in the 1960s, but we know that is not who He is."

The band won "Hard Music Recorded Song of the Year" for the song "Rattlesnake" at the 23rd GMA Dove Awards in 1992, and for "Psychedelic Super Jesus" at the 24th GMA Dove Awards in 1993.

Track listing

The album contains unlisted instrumental pieces in between select tracks, like an untitled track before "Dont Use Me" and a piano piece before "Goodbye."

Personnel
Dale Thompson - Lead Vocals, Background Vocals, Tambourine, Shakers
 Troy Thompson - Guitar, Mandolin, Acoustic Guitar, Cello, Viola
Rik Foley - Bass
Jerry McBroom - Drums

Additional personnel
Plinky - Piano and Keys, Background Vocals
Rick Elias - Harmonica
Dez Dickerson - Lead Guitar Trade Off
Greg Martin - Lead Guitar
Derek Ian - Lead Guitar
Ricke Florian - Harmony Vocals
Peter Furler - Background Vocals
John James - Background Vocals

Production
Plinky - Produced, recorded, and mixed
Dez Dickerson - Executive producer
Alan Douches - Digital editing, additional recording and mixing on "Goodbye"
Denny Purcell - Mastering

Art
Art Direction - Toni Thigpen
Design/Layout - Tufts Design Studio
Photography - Russ Harrington
Illustration - Todd Tufts

References

1992 albums
Bride (band) albums